Denis McCormack (born 1952) is an Irish retired hurler who played for Kilkenny Senior Championship club James Stephens. He also played for the Kilkenny senior hurling team and was a member of the All-Ireland Championship-winning team in 1982.

Honours

James Stephens
All-Ireland Senior Club Hurling Championship (2): 1976, 1982
Leinster Senior Club Hurling Championship (2): 1975, 1981
Kilkenny Senior Hurling Championship (3): 1975, 1976, 1981

Kilkenny
All-Ireland Senior Hurling Championship (1): 1982
Leinster Senior Hurling Championship (1): 1982
National Hurling League (1): 1981-82
Leinster Minor Hurling Championship (1): 1969

References

1952 births
Living people
James Stephens hurlers
Kilkenny inter-county hurlers